V. V. Creations is a Tamil film production company owned by S. A. Chandrasekhar's wife Shoba Chandrasekhar.

History
V.V Creations is named after their children Vijay and his late sister Vidhya. V. V. Creations ventured into film production in 1984 with  Veettuku Oru Kannagi  directed by S. A. Chandrasekhar starring Vijayakanth and Saritha. The production company then produced five more Vijayakanth starrer films and directed by S. A. Chandrasekhar. In 1991, they produced Nanbargal directed by Shoba Chandrasekhar who made her directorial debut. The film completed a 200-day run at the box-office. Following the success of Nanbargal, they produced Shoba Chandrasekhar's Innisai Mazhai. In the end of 1992, S. A. Chandrasekhar and Shoba Chandrasekhar launched their son Vijay in Naalaiya Theerpu. They then produced Nenjinile and Pandhayam.

Filmography

References

External links
 Complete List of V.V.Creations Movies

Indian film studios
Film production companies based in Chennai
1984 establishments in Tamil Nadu
Indian companies established in 1984
Mass media companies established in 1984